Vatica philastreana is a species of plant in the family Dipterocarpaceae. It is a tree found in Thailand and Vietnam.

References

philastreana
Trees of Thailand
Trees of Vietnam
Data deficient plants
Taxonomy articles created by Polbot
Taxobox binomials not recognized by IUCN